The 1999–2000 season was the 85th season of the Isthmian League, which is an English football competition featuring semi-professional and amateur clubs from London, East and South East England. The league consisted of four divisions.

Premier Division

The Premier Division consisted of 22 clubs, including 19 clubs from the previous season and three new clubs:
 Canvey Island, promoted as champions of Division One
 Hitchin Town, promoted as runners-up in Division One
 Farnborough Town, relegated from the Football Conference

Dagenham & Redbridge won the division and were promoted to the Football Conference. Aylesbury United, Boreham Wood and Walton & Hersham finished bottom of the table and relegated to Division One.

Before the start of the season Hampton changed name into Hampton & Richmond Borough.

League table

Division One

Division One consisted of 22 clubs, including 17 clubs from the previous season and five new clubs:

Two clubs relegated from the Premier Division:
 Bishop's Stortford
 Bromley

Three clubs promoted from Division Two:
 Bedford Town
 Harlow Town
 Thame United

Croydon won the division and returned to the Premier Division at the first attempt. Bedford Town and Leyton Pennant also get a promotion. Chertsey Town and Leyton Pennant relegated to Division Two, while Leatherhead were reprieved after Hemel Hempstead were refused promotion from Division Two.

League table

Division Two

Division Two consisted of 22 clubs, including 16 clubs from the previous season and six new clubs:

Three clubs relegated from Division One:
 Berkhamsted Town
 Molesey
 Wembley

Three clubs promoted from Division Three:
 Cheshunt
 Ford United
 Wingate & Finchley

Hemel Hempstead Town won the division, but were refused promotion due to ground grading. Northwood were promoted to Division One along with Ford United who get a second consecutive promotion. Wingate & Finchley finished in relegation zone along with Witham Town and Chalfont St Peter and returned to Division Three.

League table

Division Three

Division Three consisted of 21 clubs, including 17 clubs from the previous season and four new clubs:
 Abingdon Town, relegated from Division Two
 Bracknell Town, relegated from Division Two
 Great Wakering Rovers, promoted as runners-up of the Essex Senior League
 Hertford Town, relegated from Division Two

Great Wakering Rovers debuted in the league and achieved promotion at the first attempt along with East Thurrock United and Tilbury. Southall resigned and joined the Combined Counties League.

League table

See also
Isthmian League
1999–2000 Northern Premier League
1999–2000 Southern Football League

Isthmian League seasons
6